Sunil Arora (born 13 April 1956) was the 23rd Chief Election Commissioner of India.  
He is also the chairman for Association of World Election Bodies (A-WEB). He is a retired 1980 batch Indian Administrative Service (IAS) officer of Rajasthan cadre. He also served as a secretary to the Government of India in two ministries.

Personal life 
Of his two brothers, one is also an IAS officer, whereas, the other is a diplomat from the Indian Foreign Service.

Education 
Arora has graduate (BA Honours) and postgraduate (MA) degrees in English from Panjab University in the Union Territory of Chandigarh.

Career

Before IAS 
Before being appointed as an IAS officer, Sunil Arora served as an associate professor in DAV College in Jalandhar.

As an IAS officer 
As an IAS officer, Arora served in various key positions for both the Government of India and the Government of Rajasthan, including as the Additional Chief Secretary (Home), Principal Secretary (Small Industries), Principal Secretary (Investment and Protocol), Chairman and managing director of the Rajasthan State Industrial Development and Investment Corporation, Principal Secretary to the Chief Minister of Rajasthan, and as the district magistrate and collector of Jodhpur, Nagaur, Alwar and Dholpur districts in the Rajasthan Government, and as the Union Information and Broadcasting Secretary, Union Skill Development and Entrepreneurship Secretary, chairperson and managing director of the Indian Airlines, and as a joint secretary in the Ministry of Civil Aviation in the Indian government. 

Arora superannuated from service on 30 April 2016. Post retirement, Arora was appointed the director general and chief executive officer of the Indian Institute of Corporate Affairs, and hence was deemed to have been re-employed into the IAS.

Election Commissioner of India 
Arora assumed office as one of the two Election Commissioners of India on 31 August 2017, Arora assumed the office of Election Commissioner on 1 September 2017. During his tenure, 2019 Indian general election were held.

He has joined agri-tech start-up Gram Unnati as its non-executive chairman.

References

Citations

Sources 

 "Sunil Arora to take over as Chief Election Commissioner: Know about 1980-batch IAS officer who has worked for multiple ministries", 'DBPOST. from the original on 27 November 2018.

External links 

 Executive Record Sheet as maintained by Department of Personnel and Training of Government of India
 Office Service History as maintained by Department of Personnel of Government of Rajasthan

Members of the Election Commission of India
Punjabi Hindus
Punjabi people
Living people
Indian Administrative Service officers
1956 births
People from Punjab, India
People from Hoshiarpur
People from Hoshiarpur district
Panjab University alumni
Chief Election Commissioners of India